Esther is a 1956 English-language opera by Jan Meyerowitz to a libretto by Langston Hughes based on the biblical story in the Book of Esther. The opera was premiered at the Festival of Contemporary Arts at the University of Illinois at Urbana–Champaign.

References

1956 operas
Operas
Operas based on the Bible
English-language operas
Works by Langston Hughes